In supremo apostolatus is an apostolic letter or papal bull issued by Pope Gregory XVI regarding the institution of slavery. Issued on December 3, 1839, as a result of a broad consultation among the College of Cardinals, the bull resoundingly denounces both the slave trade and the continuance of the institution of slavery.

Content
The Bull outlines the history of Church attitudes to slavery, beginning with the Apostles who tolerated slavery but called on masters to "act well towards their slaves... knowing that the common Master both of themselves and of the slaves is in Heaven, and that with Him there is no distinction of persons". The Bull then discusses the involvement of Christians for and against slavery:

The Bull refers to several earlier papal pronouncements seeking to alleviate the suffering of slaves, beginning with the Letter Apostolic of Paul III, given on May 29, 1537, to the Cardinal Archbishop of Toledo, and that of Urban VIII on April 22, 1639 to the Collector Jurium of the Apostolic Chamber of Portugal; then that of Benedict XIV of December 20, 1741, to the Bishops of Brazil and some other regions; then another by Pius II, of October 7, 1462 and finally (not referring to any specific occasion) Pius VII. Pope Gregory then unambiguously condemns the continuing slave trade:

New Testament citations
Ephesians 6:5ff: Slaves, obey your earthly masters with respect and fear, and with sincerity of heart, just as you would obey Christ. Obey them not only to win their favor when their eye is on you, but as slaves of Christ, doing the will of God from your heart. (New International Version)
Colossians 3:22ff, 4:1:  Slaves, obey your earthly masters in everything; and do it, not only when their eye is on you and to curry their favor, but with sincerity of heart and reverence for the Lord; Masters, provide your slaves with what is right and fair, because you know that you also have a Master in heaven. (NIV)
Matthew 25:35, "considering that Our Lord Jesus Christ had declared that He considered as done or refused to Himself everything kind and merciful done or refused to the small and needy" (taken from In Supremo Apostolatus, Papal Encyclicals Online version).

Effects in the United States
The Bull had political consequences for the Catholic communities in slaveholding states, especially Maryland. The bishop of Charleston, John England, despite privately abhorring slavery, interpreted In supremo apostolatus in his ecclesiastical province as a condemnation of large-scale slave-trading, as opposed to the individual owning of slaves although it forbade defending the institution of slavery "under any pretext...or excuse".

In 1852, American bishops convened upon Baltimore for the First Plenary Council of Baltimore, and remarks on the conditions of slaves were kept to the need for prayers for individuals in slavery. The Irish-born archbishop of Baltimore, Francis Kenrick, raised the issue of the condition of slaves in America but concluded that "such is the state of things, [that] nothing should be attempted against the laws".

Two translations 
Two English translations of the bull are now common; these differ in one important detail. The original and contemporaneous (1844) translation includes the word unjustly, while the newer translation (prepared 128 years later) does not. Because of the inclusion of this word in the original translation (which was taken by some to imply that molestation, despoiling, and enslavement of persons was acceptable to the church, as long as those acts were not "unjust", presumably according to the perpetrators of the acts), some American bishops continued to support slave-holding interests until the abolition of slavery. (→ Catholic Church and slavery)

See also
Catholic Church and slavery

References

Catholicism and slavery
History of slavery
1839 documents
19th-century papal bulls
1839 in Christianity
Documents of Pope Gregory XVI
December 1839 events
Abolitionism